Alexander Gibson, Jr. (December 15, 1852 – April 19, 1920) was a businessman and political figure in New Brunswick, Canada. He represented York County in the Legislative Assembly of New Brunswick from 1899 to 1900 as a Liberal and represented York in the House of Commons of Canada from 1900 to 1904 as a Liberal member.

He was born in Fredericton, New Brunswick, the son of Alexander Gibson and Mary Ann Robinson. He resigned his seat in the provincial assembly to run for a federal seat in 1900. Gibson was unsuccessful in a bid for reelection to the federal parliament in 1904, and again in 1907. He served as mayor of Marysville, a town founded by his father and now part of Fredericton.

References 

 

1852 births
1920 deaths
Liberal Party of Canada MPs
Members of the House of Commons of Canada from New Brunswick
Mayors of places in New Brunswick
New Brunswick Liberal Association MLAs